Shahrak-e Rustayi-ye Naser (also Romanized as Shahrak-e Rūstāyī-ye Naşer) is a village in Dul Rural District, in the Central District of Urmia County, West Azerbaijan Province, Iran. At the 2006 census, its population was 286, in 92 families.

References 

Populated places in Urmia County